Gaurav Gill is a professional rally driver and an Indian motorsports athlete who competes in the Asia-Pacific Rally Championship. In 2013, Gaurav Gill became the first Indian driver to win the FIA Asia-Pacific Rally Championship and went on to win two more APRC titles in  2016 and 2018. Gill became the first sportsperson from Motorsports to win the coveted Arjuna Award from the President of India in 2019.

Gaurav Gill also holds the record for the highest number of the Indian National Rally Championship title for four-wheelers along with Naren Kumar. He equaled the record of Kumar by winning his seventh title in 2020. The last four of his seven titles were won with the Mahindra Adventure team with experienced Musa Sherif as navigator. Gaurav also took part in the World Rally Championship round in Australia in 2018 as an unregistered driver in the WRC2 class driving for new development MRF Tyres, making him the only Indian driver to do so ever.

Early life and career
Gaurav was born on 2 December 1981. He got into motorsport racing motorbikes and competed in the National Motocross Championship in 1999. He moved to 4-wheel racing and started competing in car rallies and endurance races. He signed up for the Raid-de-Himalaya in 2000. He was runner-up in the National Road Racing Championship in 2003 and won the title in the following year. He finished the 2006 season, second overall. In 2007, Gaurav won the National Rally Championship with Team MRF and made his debut at the Asia Pacific Rally Championship. He finished runner up in the APRC in 2012 and became the first Indian to win the title in 2013 for Team MRF Skoda.

Career results

APRC results

Awards
Arjuna Award In Motorsport

References

External links
 GauravGill.com
Profile on ewrc-results.com

1981 births
Living people
Indian rally drivers
Indian racing drivers
World Rally Championship drivers
JK Tyre National Level Racing Championship drivers
MRF Challenge Formula 2000 Championship drivers
Recipients of the Arjuna Award
Škoda Motorsport drivers